The Horten H.VII was a flying wing fighter-trainer aircraft designed by the Horten brothers in Nazi Germany during World War II.

Development

The H.VII was originally allocated the Reichsluftfahrtministerium (RLM) designation 8-226, but was later given the new RLM designation 8-254, so it was known by inference as Horten Ho 226 or Horten Ho 254, though these designations were little used in practice.

In 1942 the H.VII design began as a test-bed for the Schmitt-Argus pulse-jet engine but this project was cancelled in 1943 and the aircraft's role became that of a trainer. It was based on the Horten H.V but with more powerful Argus As 10C engines. Walter Horten piloted its first flight in May 1944 and took part in many hours of a series of test flights, partly intended to quell concerns about the tailless aircraft's controllability in the case of an asymmetric power loss.

Two prototypes were built and the H.VII V-3, nearing completion by the time that the allied advance reached the Peschke factory in Minden, would have been the first of twenty production aircraft. Two H.VIIs were destroyed in the advance and one taken to the USSR.

Specifications (H.VII)

References

Flying wings
H07
Aircraft first flown in 1944
Twin-engined piston aircraft